The Samsung Galaxy NX is a hybrid mirrorless interchangeable lens camera manufactured by Samsung, announced in June 2013. The Galaxy NX is an Android (4.2.2, upgradeable to Android Jelly Bean MR1) based mobile device which is the first of its kind. It is a 20.3 megapixel using the Samsung NX-mount as well as Wi-Fi and 3G connectivity, and a GPS receiver by which the camera can make geotagged photographs. 

While the device runs on Android, it is not a smartphone in the sense that it does not have a telephone function. Instead, its wireless connectivity can be used for telecommunication (including video) over the Internet.

Included software allows for in-camera organizing, editing and online sharing or storage of images and videos. As with other Android devices, other software can be downloaded from Google Play.

The device has a "familiar DSLR look", with a larger LCD touchscreen than is customary for that category but fewer buttons and dials. The touchscreen and voice control are used primarily for controlling the camera.

The device has one processor for Android and another, DRIMe IV, for photographic processing.

The Samsung Galaxy NX was discontinued in 2017.

References 

Galaxy NX
Android cameras with optical zoom
Cameras introduced in 2013
Digital cameras with CMOS image sensor